La Fiebre is a Tejano music band from Pasadena, Texas.

History 

The band formed in 1986. They have said that they chose their name after suffering from several fevers due to trying to develop a name for themselves. The original band members were Ricardo Garza jr., Pete Espinoza, Rudy Rocha, Joe Angel Reynosa, Luis Ayala, Juan Manuel "Johnny" Tristan, and Eric Jimenez. In 1987 the group recorded their first album, Contagious, under their own label. This album gave them their first two charted songs, Vestida De Color De Rosa and Por Tu Culpa. Their 1991 album, On The Rise, produced the single Borracho De Besos, and sold over 100,000 copies in the United States, staying on the Billboard magazine chart for several weeks. The album 'No Cure' also sold over 100,000 copies within the First few weeks of the release. 'No Cure' contained hits like 'El Amor Se Acaba', 'Eres Mi Primer Amor', 'Aquel Carino' and 'Labios De Cereza'. In 1996 the group began to part ways. Eric Jimenez was the first to leave the group in order to write and produce for other artists. In February 1997 La Fiebre left EMI Latin records and signed on with Freddie Records. Shortly after the release of their album, Fenomenal, Luis Ayala left the group for personal reasons but returned to the group to record the album Reunidos and reestablish the trumpet sound the La Fiebre had been known for.  In 1998 La Fiebre received a Grammy nomination in the category of Best Tejano Album for their album Fiebre Live En Concierto. The album was recorded at the Freddy Fest that took place in Corpus Christi, Texas and at a concert held in San Antonio, Texas.

Discography
 Catch It! It's Contagious (1988)
 On The Rise (1989)
 Out Of Control (1990)
 Personal Best (1991)
 No Cure (1991)
 From Houston With Luv (1992)
 Tejano All Stars: La Fiebre (1992)
 911 (1993)
 Nuestras Mejores Canciones: 17 Super Exitos (1993)
 The Best 12 (1993)
 Fiebre (1994)
 La Fiebre Presents Luis Ayala (1995)
 Hasta El Final (1996)
 Fenomenal (1997)
 The Best Of La Fiebre & Xelencia (1998)
 Live En Concierto (1998)
 La Navidad (1998)
 Evolucion (2000)
 15 De Coleccion: La Fiebre (2004)
 Reunidos (2004)
 911 (Reissue)(2005)
 Anthology (2006)
 No Cure (Reissue) (2006)
 30 del Recuerdo (2006)
 Serie 3X4 (2007)
 Nueva Era (2014)
 Fiesta (2017)
 Historico (2021)

References 

Musical groups from Texas
Tejano music groups